Sathya Sandeepani (born 27 August 1999) is a Sri Lankan cricketer. In December 2019, she played for Sri Lanka in the women's tournament at the 2019 South Asian Games. The Sri Lankan team won the silver medal, after losing to Bangladesh by two runs in the final.

In January 2020, she was selected in Sri Lanka's squad for the 2020 ICC Women's T20 World Cup. She made her Women's Twenty20 International (WT20I) debut for Sri Lanka, against India, on 29 February 2020.

In October 2021, she was named as one of five reserve players in Sri Lanka's team for the 2021 Women's Cricket World Cup Qualifier tournament in Zimbabwe. In January 2022, she was named as one of four reserve players in Sri Lanka's team for the 2022 Commonwealth Games Cricket Qualifier tournament in Malaysia.

References

1999 births
Living people
Sri Lankan women cricketers
Sri Lanka women Twenty20 International cricketers
Sportspeople from Galle
South Asian Games silver medalists for Sri Lanka
South Asian Games medalists in cricket